The Asheville Open was a golf tournament on the LPGA Tour from 1957 to 1960. It was played at the Asheville Country Club in Asheville, North Carolina. In 1958 and 1959, some rounds were also played at the Beaver Lake Golf Club and the Biltmore Forest Country Club.

Winners
Asheville Open
1960 Betsy Rawls

Land of the Sky Open
1959 Betsy Rawls

Land of Sky Open
1958 Marlene Hagge
1957 Beverly Hanson

References

Former LPGA Tour events
Golf in North Carolina
Women's sports in North Carolina
Sports in Asheville, North Carolina
Recurring sporting events established in 1957
Recurring sporting events disestablished in 1960
1957 establishments in North Carolina
1960 disestablishments in North Carolina